Rodney Glunder (born as Rodney Faverus, March 1, 1975) is a retired Dutch professional kickboxer, mixed martial artist, professional wrestler and boxer, current actor, entrepreneur and bodybuilder. He has fought for M-1 Global, Cage Rage, K-1, PRIDE Fighting Championship, RINGS, Glory, Konfrontacja Sztuk Walki, It's Showtime, SuperKombat, SLAMM!! Events and Art of War Fighting Championship. Glunder holds notable wins over top contenders Cheick Kongo, Valentijn Overeem, Joe Riggs, Melvin Manhoef, Cyrille Diabaté, Brian Douwes and Gregory Tony.

In March 2022 Glunder was charged with rape by the Dutch authorities.
On March 25, 2022, he was found guilty and has been sentenced to 5 years in prison.

Mixed martial arts and kickboxing career
Glunder began practicing martial arts at the age of 18, with Kyokushin kaikan and Taekwondo. He has a son who fights as a professional kickboxer, Massaro Glunder (born in 1994). In 1997, he won the European full contact karate championships. Rodney began competing in mixed martial arts in 1996, and is a journeyman of the sport with almost fifty fights. Rodney has never been knocked out in professional kickboxing, in late-2014 Glunder was knocked out with a knee to the body in a kickboxing bout, but has been knocked out only once in professional mixed martial arts competition by former UFC contender and fellow Dutch fighter Gilbert Yvel who knocked Glunder unconscious with a series of punches at 2 Hot 2 Handle: Pride and Honor in 2006. Glunder is also the first person to ever defeat veterans Brian Douwes and Mikko Rupponen by technical knockout.

In April 2003, Rodney made his K-1 debut against former UFC and Strikeforce contender Joe Riggs at the K-1 Holland Grand Prix 2003 and won via knockout within the first round. He won his first K-1 GP in June 2006, when he defeated three opponents in one night to be crowned the K-1 Canarias 2006 champion.

In May 2012, Glunder entered the SuperKombat World GP to accept a fight against Romanian kickboxer Andrei Stoica after Stoica referred to Glunder's sparring partner and fellow Surinamese fighter Redouan Cairo as "the nigger" in a post fight interview after Stoica's recent fight with Cairo. Glunder later lost the fight via decision in a fight many believe Glunder had won, after the fight Glunder went on to say he felt he lost the fight due to Stoica being the "poster boy" for SuperKombat and Romanian judges biased toward Surinamese fighters.

Rodney replaced injured K-1 legend Jérôme Le Banner against Marcin Różalski at KSW 20, losing the fight via unanimous decision.

On April 20, 2013, at the Rumble of the North II event Glunder fought his last career fight, this time under boxing rules. He defeated Janos Tiborcz by first-round KO and retired from contact sports shortly after.

On May 31, 2014, Rodney has decided to come out of retirement to take a fight against Porud Gym fighter Koos Wessels Boer for the vacant M.O.N Muay Thai European Championship at Rumble of the North IV.

Professional wrestling career

After retiring from fighting Glunder has decided to once again pursue a career in professional wrestling, Rodney was previously the owner of New Blood Wrestling in Jan 2004, the promotion folded a year later near the end of 2005, and also occasionally wrestled for German promotion Westside Xtreme Wrestling and Pro Wrestling Holland after his promotion folded. On June 22, 2013, Glunder is set to make his return to wrestling at a Pro Wrestling Showdown event in a tag team match, teaming with former WWE competitor Joe E. Legend after Legend's partner Sean Lucas suffered an injury during training. After winning this match with Legend he later joined the Red Star Empire stable alongside Rico Bushido and Adam Polak, replacing Red Star member Lloyd Pengel after Pengel cost the team to lose a number of previous matches. Pengel was later allowed back into the Red Star Empire after suffering a beating at the hands of Glunder and Bushido.

After a couple weeks of inactivity Glunder returned with his Red Star team to challenge WWE Hall of Fame inductee Tony Atlas to a match after Glunder told Atlas he is a better bodybuilder than Atlas ever was, Glunder recently started bodybuilding in 2013 and Atlas is a 30-year bodybuilding veteran, Glunder also went on to say he wanted the match to be a no holds barred match, Atlas later accepted the match and is set to take place at the PWS 13 event on February 23, 2014, in Purmerend, Netherlands. The match was declared a no-contest by the referee when Glunder refused to release his guillotine choke submission after Atlas fell unconscious as he grabbed the ring ropes, Glunder was later suspended by PWS executives for several months.  A year after his suspension ended Rodney made sporadic appearances on the Holland independent circuit,  Glunder later decided to re-retire from professional wrestling in March 2016 to pursue a career in acting, specifically in direct to TV films in the Netherlands.

Titles and championships
 CFC World Heavyweight Champion (one time, last)
 ISKA Cruiserweight (86–95 kg) Champion (one time)
 IKBO World Heavyweight Champion (one time)
 2006 K-1 Canarias GP Champion
 IMA Mix Fight World Champion (one time)
 RINGS Intercontinental Champion (two times)
 IMA Mix Fight European Champion (one time)
 2003 RINGS Durata GP Champion
 RINGS Free Fight Dutch Champion (three times, last)
 2000 Mix Fight European Champion
 1997 Full Contact Karate European Champion

Mixed martial arts record

|-
| Loss
| align=center| 25–20–3 (1)
| Marcin Rózalski
| Decision (unanimous)
| KSW 20
| 
| align=center| 3
| align=center| 5:00
| Gdańsk, Poland
|
|-
| Loss
| align=center| 25–19–3 (1)
| Dion Staring
| Technical Submission (kimura)
| Glory 11
| 
| align=center| 1
| align=center| 2:42
| Amsterdam, Netherlands
|
|-
| NC
| align=center| 25–18–3 (1)
| Antônio Braga Neto
| No Contest (fighter fell from ring)
| Art of War 14
| 
| align=center| 1
| align=center| 0:24
| Macau, China
|
|-
| Win
| align=center| 25–18–3
| Arnoldas Joknys
| TKO (punches and elbows)
| Cage Fighters Championships 5
| 
| align=center| 1
| align=center| 2:42
| Riga, Latvia
| 
|-
| Loss
| align=center| 24–18–3
| Victor Valimaki
| Submission (rear naked choke)
| M-1 Challenge 10: Finland
| 
| align=center| 1
| align=center| 2:14
| Helsinki, Finland
|
|-
| Loss
| align=center| 24–17–3
| James Zikic
| Submission (armbar)
| Cage Rage 26
| 
| align=center| 3
| align=center| 0:25
| London, England
|
|-
| Loss
| align=center| 24–16–3
| Robert Jocz
| Decision (split)
| Beast of the East
| 
| align=center| 3
| align=center| 5:00
| Amsterdam, Netherlands
|
|-
| Loss
| align=center| 24–15–3
| Krzysztof Kulak
| Submission (injury)
| Return of the King 2
| 
| align=center| 3
| align=center| N/A
| Paramaribo, Suriname
|
|-
| Loss
| align=center| 24–14–3
| Renato Sobral
| Technical Submission (arm-triangle choke)
| PFP: Ring of Fire
| 
| align=center| 3
| align=center| 1:00
| Quezon City, Philippines
|
|-
| Loss
| align=center| 24–13–3
| Maro Perak
| TKO (injury)
| WFC 3: Bad Sunday
| 
| align=center| 1
| align=center| 5:00
| Domžale, Slovenia
| 
|-
| Win
| align=center| 24–12–3
| Chinto Mordillo
| KO (punches)
| Return of the King 1
| 
| align=center| 1
| align=center| 0:08
| Paramaribo, Suriname
|
|-
| Loss
| align=center| 23–12–3
| Gilbert Yvel
| KO (punches)
| 2H2H – Pride & Honor
| 
| align=center| 1
| align=center| 1:38
| Rotterdam, Netherlands
|
|-
| Win
| align=center| 23–11–3
| Mikko Rupponen
| TKO (broken hand)
| WFC 2: Evolution
| 
| align=center| 2
| align=center| 0:22
| Koper, Slovenia
|
|-
| Loss
| align=center| 22–11–3
| Yuki Sasaki
| Submission (armbar)
| WCFC: No Guts No Glory
| 
| align=center| 1
| align=center| 4:40
| Manchester, England
|
|-
| Win
| align=center| 22–10–3
| Henriques Zowa
| Decision
| It's Showtime: Amsterdam Arena
| 
| align=center| N/A
| align=center| N/A
| Amsterdam, Netherlands
|
|-
| Loss
| align=center| 21–10–3
| Ramazan Akhadullaev
| Decision (split)
| M-1 MFC: Heavyweight GP
| 
| align=center| 2
| align=center| 5:00
| Moscow, Russia
|
|-
| Loss
| align=center| 21–9–3
| Alistair Overeem
| Submission (guillotine choke)
| 2 Hot 2 Handle
| 
| align=center| 1
| align=center| N/A
| Rotterdam, Netherlands
| 
|-
| Win
| align=center| 21–8–3
| Melvin Manhoef
| KO (punches)
| It's Showtime 2004 Amsterdam
| 
| align=center| 2
| align=center| 4:43
| Amsterdam, Netherlands
|
|-
| Win
| align=center| 20–8–3
| Dave Vader
| Decision (unanimous)
| Rings Holland: World's Greatest
| 
| align=center| 3
| align=center| 5:00
| Utrecht, Netherlands
| 
|-
| Win
| align=center| 19–8–3
| Cyrille Diabaté
| Decision (unanimous)
| 2 Hot 2 Handle
| 
| align=center| 2
| align=center| 5:00
| Amsterdam, Netherlands
|
|-
| Loss
| align=center| 18–8–3
| Chalid Arrab
| Decision (unanimous)
| PRIDE Bushido 1
| 
| align=center| 2
| align=center| 5:00
| Saitama, Japan
|
|-
| Win
| align=center| 18–7–3
| Miodrag Petkovic
| TKO (punches)
| RINGS Durata World Grand Prix 2
| 
| align=center| 1
| align=center| 0:11
| Opatija, Croatia
| 
|-
| Win
| align=center| 17–7–3
| Nikolai Onikienko
| Decision
| RINGS Durata World Grand Prix 2
| 
| align=center| 1
| align=center| 5:00
| Opatija, Croatia
|
|-
| Win
| align=center| 16–7–3
| Jose Ramalho
| Decision
| RINGS Durata World Grand Prix 2
| 
| align=center| 1
| align=center| 5:00
| Opatija, Croatia
|
|-
| Win
| align=center| 15–7–3
| Sergey Kaznovsky
| Submission (armbar)
| It's Showtime 2003 Amsterdam
| 
| align=center| 1
| align=center| 3:41
| Amsterdam, Netherlands
|
|-
| Win
| align=center| 14–7–3
| Tommy Sauer
| TKO (doctor stoppage)
| Rings Holland: One Moment In Time
| 
| align=center| 2
| align=center| 3:52
| Utrecht, Netherlands
| 
|-
| Win
| align=center| 13–7–3
| Valentijn Overeem
| Submission (forfeit)
| 2H2H 5 – Simply the Best 5
| 
| align=center| 1
| align=center| 3:00
| Rotterdam, Netherlands
|
|-
| Win
| align=center| 12–7–3
| Cheick Kongo
| Decision (unanimous)
| Rings Holland: Saved by the Bell
| 
| align=center| 2
| align=center| 5:00
| Amsterdam, Netherlands
| 
|-
| Loss
| align=center| 11–7–3
| Martin Malkhasyan
| Submission (kneebar)
| M-1 MFC – Russia vs. the World 3
| 
| align=center| 1
| align=center| 3:34
| Saint Petersburg, Russia
|
|-
| Win
| align=center| 11–6–3
| Fatih Kocamis
| Decision (split)
| 2H2H 4 – Simply the Best 4
| 
| align=center| 2
| align=center| 5:00
| Rotterdam, Netherlands
|
|-
| Win
| align=center| 10–6–3
| Paul Cahoon
| TKO (doctor stoppage)
| Rings Holland: Some Like It Hard
| 
| align=center| 3
| align=center| 1:53
| Utrecht, Netherlands
| 
|-
| Draw
| align=center| 9–6–3
| Cyrille Diabaté
| Draw
| Rings Holland: No Guts, No Glory
| 
| align=center| 2
| align=center| 5:00
| Amsterdam, Netherlands
|
|-
| Win
| align=center| 9–6–2
| Ricardo Fyeet
| Submission (guillotine choke)
| Rings Holland: Heroes Live Forever
| 
| align=center| 2
| align=center| 1:04
| Utrecht, Netherlands
| 
|-
| Win
| align=center| 8–6–2
| Fabrice Bernardin
| DQ (illegal strikes)
| Kam Lung – Only the Strongest Survive 2
| 
| align=center| 1
| align=center| N/A
| Hellevoetsluis, Netherlands
|
|-
| Win
| align=center| 7–6–2
| Tjerk Vermanen
| TKO (spinning back kick)
| It's Showtime – Exclusive
| 
| align=center| 1
| align=center| 0:47
| Haarlem, Netherlands
|
|-
| Win
| align=center| 6–6–2
| Iwan de Groot
| TKO (knees)
| Together Productions – Fight Gala
| 
| align=center| 1
| align=center| N/A
| Zaandam, Netherlands
|
|-
| Loss
| align=center| 5–6–2
| Jose Landi-Jons
| Technical Submission (armbar)
| Amsterdam Absolute Championship 2
| 
| align=center| 1
| align=center| 6:25
| Amsterdam, Netherlands
|
|-
| Loss
| align=center| 5–5–2
| Alexandre Ferreira
| TKO (submission to punches)
| World Vale Tudo Championship 8
| 
| align=center| 1
| align=center| 1:59
| Aruba
|
|-
| Win
| align=center| 5–4–2
| Silvio Zimmerman
| TKO (strikes)
| World Vale Tudo Championship 8
| 
| align=center| 1
| align=center| 5:07
| Aruba
|
|-
| Draw
| align=center| 4–4–2
| Melvin Manhoef
| Draw
| Rings Holland: The Kings of the Magic Ring
| 
| align=center| 2
| align=center| 5:00
| Utrecht, Netherlands
|
|-
| Loss
| align=center| 4–4–1
| Sergei Belov
| Submission (armbar)
| IAFC – Pankration World Championship 1999
| 
| align=center| 1
| align=center| 7:55
| Moscow, Russia
|
|-
| Loss
| align=center| 4–3–1
| Michele Verginelli
| Submission (rear naked choke)
| Ultimate Fights Brescia
| 
| align=center| 1
| align=center| 11:29
| Brescia, Italy
|
|-
| Loss
| align=center| 4–2–1
| Richard Plug
| Decision (1-0 points)
| FFH – Free Fight Gala
| 
| align=center| N/A
| align=center| N/A
| Beverwijk, Netherlands
|
|-
| Win
| align=center| 4–1–1
| Tomas Valatkevicius
| Decision
| KO Power Tournament
| 
| align=center| 1
| align=center| 10:00
| Amsterdam, Netherlands
|
|-
| Win
| align=center| 3–1–1
| Sergei Zavadsky
| TKO (punches)
| M-1 MFC – World Championship 1998
| 
| align=center| 1
| align=center| 0:35
| Saint Petersburg, Russia
|
|-
| Draw
| align=center| 2–1–1
| Habib Ben Sallah
| Draw
| FFH – Free Fight Gala
| 
| align=center| 1
| align=center| 5:00
| Beverwijk, Netherlands
|
|-
| Loss
| align=center| 2–1
| Sergei Bytchkov
| Decision
| M-1 MFC – World Championship 1997
| 
| align=center| 1
| align=center| 10:00
| Saint Petersburg, Russia
|
|-
| Win
| align=center| 2–0
| Rik de Jager
| KO (knee to the body)
| Rings Holland – Utrecht at War
| 
| align=center| 2
| align=center| 1:10
| Utrecht, Netherlands
|
|-
| Win
| align=center| 1–0
| Piet Bernzen
| Decision
| Fight Gala – Mix Fight Night
| 
| align=center| 3
| align=center| 5:00
| Haarlem, Netherlands
|

Kickboxing record

Boxing record

Entrance music

See also 
 List of K-1 events
 List of K-1 champions
 List of male kickboxers
 List of male mixed martial artists
 List of male boxers

References

External links
 
 Rodney Glunder Official Website
 Rodney Glunder Official Website

1975 births
Living people
Dutch male mixed martial artists
Light heavyweight mixed martial artists
Heavyweight mixed martial artists
Mixed martial artists utilizing taekwondo
Mixed martial artists utilizing Kyokushin kaikan
Mixed martial artists utilizing boxing
Mixed martial artists utilizing wrestling
Mixed martial artists utilizing Brazilian jiu-jitsu
Dutch bodybuilders
Dutch male kickboxers
Cruiserweight kickboxers
Heavyweight kickboxers
Dutch male karateka
Dutch male taekwondo practitioners
Dutch practitioners of Brazilian jiu-jitsu
Sportspeople from Leiden
Dutch sportspeople of Surinamese descent
Sportspeople from Paramaribo
Heavyweight boxers
Dutch male professional wrestlers
Dutch male boxers
SUPERKOMBAT kickboxers